Nick Aliotti (born May 29, 1954) is an American football coach. He was recently the defensive coordinator of the Arizona Hotshots of the Alliance of American Football.

Early life and playing career

Coaching career
After graduation from Davis, Aliotti spent two years as a graduate assistant football coach on Rich Brooks' staff at Oregon, and in 1980, was hired as the running backs coach by new Oregon State coach Joe Avezzano. After four years with the Beavers, Aliotti was hired as offensive coordinator at Chico State. In 1988, he returned to Oregon as linebackers coach, later becoming defensive coordinator.

After the 1994 season and the Rose Bowl, Brooks was hired by the St. Louis Rams of the NFL, and Aliotti went with him as special teams coach. Brooks  lasted just two seasons with the Rams, and Aliotti became the defensive coordinator at UCLA in 1998. He returned to Eugene in 1999 and was the defensive coordinator for the next fifteen seasons under head coaches Mike Bellotti, Chip Kelly, and Mark Helfrich.

Allioti retired following the 2013 season, after the Alamo Bowl.

In 2018, he returned to coaching as the defensive coordinator of the Arizona Hotshots of the Alliance of American Football.

Personal
Aliotti's brother Joe was the starting quarterback at Boise State (1979, 1980); a junior college transfer (Los Medanos), he led the Broncos to a  record as a junior and the  national championship as a senior.

References

1954 births
Living people
American football running backs
Arizona Hotshots coaches
Chico State Wildcats football coaches
Oregon Ducks football coaches
Oregon State Beavers football coaches
St. Louis Rams coaches
UC Davis Aggies football coaches
UC Davis Aggies football players
Sportspeople from Walnut Creek, California
Coaches of American football from California
Players of American football from California